The Office of Emergency Planning (OEP) is a civil/military body within Ireland's Department of Defence responsible for the co-ordination and oversight of emergency planning between state agencies. It is answerable to the Minister for Defence.

Structure
The Office of Emergency Planning was established in 2001 to oversee Ireland's emergency planning process. The OEP encompasses both civil and military staff and is located in the Department of Defence Headquarters. The OEP chairs the Government Task Force Subgroups on Emergency Planning. These subgroups comprise senior officials representing government departments and public authorities with support roles in the state's emergency plans. The Government Task Force on Emergency Planning charges the subgroups with carrying out specific studies and developing particular aspects of emergency planning. The subgroups are the means by which expertise is shared between different government departments and public authorities on emergency planning. Their role is to minimise the potential consequences of any given emergency.

Major emergencies in Ireland are categorised under;
 Severe weather
 Flooding
 Chemical spills
 Transport accidents (air, sea, rail, road)
 Accidents at sea
 Major pollution incidents at sea
 Bomb explosions, terrorism and suspicious packages
 Nuclear incidents
 Influenza pandemic
 Animal disease outbreak

Government Task Force on Emergency Planning
The Government Task Force on Emergency Planning was formed following the September 11 attacks in 2001 on the United States. The Task Force is the top-level structure which gives policy and direction to the Office of Emergency Planning, and which coordinates and oversees the emergency planning activities of all government departments and public authorities. The Minister for Defence chairs this Government Task Force, which includes Ministers, senior officials of government departments, senior officers of the Defence Forces, the Garda Síochána and officials of other key public authorities which have a lead or support role in the government's emergency planning.

Emergency Planning subgroups
 Interdepartmental Group on Emergency Planning
 Emergency Planning subgroup on National Risk Assessment
 Emergency Planning subgroup on Roles & Responsibilities
 Emergency Planning subgroup on CBRN
 Emergency Planning subgroup on Severe Weather Events
 Emergency Planning subgroup on Communications & Flooding
 Emergency Planning subgroup on Electricity Contingency Planning
 National Steering Group on Major Emergency Management
 National Emergency Planning Group on Nuclear Accidents (NEPNA)

See also
 National Security Committee (NSC)
 Radiological Protection Institute of Ireland (RPII)
 National Cyber Security Centre (NCSC)
 Civil Defence Ireland

References

External links
 Office of Emergency Planning (Department of Defence) official website

Disaster preparedness
Emergency management
Government agencies of the Republic of Ireland
Military of the Republic of Ireland
Department of Defence (Ireland)